Clathria matthewsi is a species of sea sponge first found on the coast of South Georgia island, in the south west Southern Ocean.

References

Further reading
Goodwin, Claire, et al. "Sponge biodiversity of Beauchêne and the Sea Lion Islands and south-east East Falkland, Falkland Islands, with a description of nine new species." Journal of the Marine Biological Association of the United Kingdom: 1-28.
HOOPER, JOHN NA, et al. "SPONGES OF THE LOW ISLES, GREAT BARRIER REEF: AN IM POR TANT SCI EN TIFIC SITE, OR A CASE OF MIS TAKEN IDEN TITY?."

External links
WORMS

Poecilosclerida